Frank Lange (born 26 November 1934) is a German bobsledder. He competed in the four-man event at the 1968 Winter Olympics.

References

1934 births
Living people
German male bobsledders
Olympic bobsledders of West Germany
Bobsledders at the 1968 Winter Olympics
Sportspeople from Wuppertal
20th-century German people